SSOT may refer to:
 Single source of truth in information systems
 State Sponsors of Terrorism, United States Department of State designation
 SSOT (satellite), a Chilean Earth imaging satellite